The following are the unofficial national records in speed skating in Portugal. Portugal is not a member of the ISU.

Men

Women

References

Portugal
Speed skating-related lists
Portugal
Speed skating
Speed skating